Moira Stewartová (born 9 June 1995) is a Czech long-distance runner. She won the women's race at the Cross della Vallagarina held in Italy both in 2019 and in 2020.

In 2019, she competed in the senior women's race at the 2019 IAAF World Cross Country Championships. She finished in 70th place. In the same year, she also competed in the women's event at the 2019 European 10,000m Cup held in London, United Kingdom. In 2020, she competed in the women's half marathon at the 2020 World Athletics Half Marathon Championships held in Gdynia, Poland.

References

External links 
 

Living people
1995 births
Place of birth missing (living people)
Czech female middle-distance runners
Czech female long-distance runners
Czech female cross country runners
Czech Athletics Championships winners
20th-century Czech women
21st-century Czech women